Ahmed Pochee (23 September 1939 – 18 December 1998) was a British-Indian wine merchant and entrepreneur, notably the founder of Oddbins and the Great Wapping Wine Company.

Early life
Pochee was born on 23 September 1939, to an Indian father of Arab or Persian descent. His father had become blind whilst studying Medicine, but despite his disability, he worked as a chef and opened the first Indian restaurant in Edinburgh.

References

1939 births
1998 deaths
Wine merchants
British businesspeople of Indian descent
English people of Indian descent
English people of Iranian descent
Alumni of the University of Westminster
20th-century British businesspeople